Kamila Volčanšek (born 19 March 1950) is a Slovene painter and illustrator of children's books.

Volčanšek was born in Brežice in 1950. She graduated from the Academy of Fine Arts in Ljubljana in 1978. She has illustrated numerous children's books and won the Levstik Award in 1981 for her illustrations for the book Kralj Drozgobrad (King Thrushbeard) by the Brothers Grimm.

Selected illustrated works

 Pogašeni zmaj (The Extinguished Dragon), written by Bina Štampe Žmavc, 2003
 Bohinjske pravljice (Fairy Tales from Bohinj), 1999
 Denar naredi vse (Money Can Do Everything), written by Italo Calvino, 1995
 Janko in Metka (Hansel and Gretel), written by Brothers Grimm, 1994
 Deklica lastovica (The Swallow Girl), Slovene folk tale, 1989
 Turjaška Rozamunda(Rosamund of Turjak Castle), written by France Prešeren, 1985  
 Stara Ljubljana (Old Ljubljana), written by Niko Grafenauer, 1983
 Cesarjev slavec (The Nightingale), written by Hans Christian Andersen, 1981
 Kralj Drozgobrad (King Thrushbeard), written by Brothers Grimm, 1980

References

Slovenian illustrators
Slovenian children's book illustrators
Slovenian women illustrators
Slovenian painters
Living people
1950 births
People from Brežice
Levstik Award laureates
University of Ljubljana alumni
Slovenian women artists